Theodore "Ted" Raimi (born December 14, 1965) is an American character actor, director, comedian, and writer. He is known for his roles in the works of his brother Sam Raimi, including a fake Shemp in The Evil Dead, possessed Henrietta in Evil Dead II, and Ted Hoffman in the Spider-Man trilogy. He later reprised his role as Henrietta in the television series Ash vs. Evil Dead, in which he also played the character Chet Kaminski. He is also known for his roles as Lieutenant JG Tim O'Neill in seaQuest DSV and Joxer the Mighty in Xena: Warrior Princess and Hercules: The Legendary Journeys.

Raimi has appeared in minor roles in a number of other films and television series, including the films Crimewave, Intruder, Shocker, Darkman, Candyman, Army of Darkness, Clear and Present Danger, The Grudge, Drag Me to Hell, and Oz the Great and Powerful, as well as the television series ALF, Twin Peaks, Baywatch, and Supernatural. He has had voice roles in the television series Invader Zim and Code Monkeys, and in the video games Evil Dead: Regeneration and The Quarry.

Early life
Raimi was born to a Jewish family in Detroit, Michigan, the son of Celia (née Abrams), a lingerie store proprietor, and Leonard Raimi, a furniture store proprietor. Ted was raised in Conservative Judaism; his ancestors immigrated from Russia and Hungary. He attended Wylie E. Groves High School in Beverly Hills, Michigan, where he was a popular DJ on WGHS, a blues harp prodigy, and an active member of the Groves Cinema Society. At seventeen he began his professional acting career doing industrial films in Detroit for Ford, General Motors and Chrysler. He attended University of Michigan, New York University, then finally University of Detroit. Raimi's older brothers are director Sam Raimi and screenwriter Ivan Raimi.

Career
Raimi's motion picture acting credits include Wes Craven's Shocker, Born Yesterday, Patriot Games, Clear and Present Danger, The Evil Dead, Evil Dead II, Army of Darkness, Darkman and the Spider-Man series, as well as roles in such features as Stuart Saves His Family, The Grudge, Midnight Meat Train and Oz the Great and Powerful.

On television, he has been seen on shows such as Twin Peaks, CSI: NY, Supernatural and Legend of the Seeker but is best known for his roles as the communication officer Lt. Tim O'Neill on the science fiction television series seaQuest DSV (later seaQuest 2032) and starring as the warrior wannabe Joxer on Xena: Warrior Princess.

Raimi wrote the original "Joxer the Mighty" song with help from director Josh Becker for Xena: Warrior Princess. In 2022, he joined director Alex Kahuam for his upcoming feature film, Failure!, which was shot entirely in a single long-take.

Selected filmography

Film

Television

Video games

Non-acting work

References

Further reading

External links

2005 MarsDust Interview

1965 births
Male actors from Detroit
20th-century American male actors
21st-century American male actors
Jewish American male comedians
American male comedians
American male film actors
American male television actors
American television directors
American television writers
American male voice actors
American male television writers
American people of Russian-Jewish descent
American people of Hungarian-Jewish descent
University of Michigan alumni
New York University alumni
Michigan State University alumni
Jewish American male actors
Jewish American writers
Living people
People from Royal Oak, Michigan
University of Detroit Mercy alumni
Writers from Detroit
Screenwriters from Michigan
Raimi family
20th-century American comedians
21st-century American comedians
21st-century American Jews